Erle Stanley Gardner (July 17, 1889 – March 11, 1970) was an American lawyer and author. He is best known for the Perry Mason series of detective stories, but he wrote numerous other novels and shorter pieces and also a series of nonfiction books, mostly narrations of his travels through Baja California and other regions in Mexico.

The best-selling American author of the 20th century at the time of his death, Gardner also published under numerous pseudonyms, including A.A. Fair, Carl Franklin Ruth, Carleton Kendrake, Charles M. Green, Charles J. Kenny, Edward Leaming, Grant Holiday, Kyle Corning, Les Tillray,  Robert Parr, Stephen Caldwell, and once as Perry Mason character Della Street (The Case of the Suspect Sweethearts). Three stories were published as Anonymous (A Fair Trial, Part Music and Part Tears, and You Can't Run Away from Yourself aka The Jazz Baby).

Life and work

Gardner was born in Malden, Massachusetts, the son of Grace Adelma (Waugh) and Charles Walter Gardner. Gardner graduated from Palo Alto High School in California in 1909 and enrolled at Valparaiso University School of Law in Indiana. He was suspended after approximately one month when his interest in boxing became a distraction.  He returned to California, pursued his legal education on his own, and passed the California State Bar examination in 1911.

Gardner started his legal career by working as a typist at a law firm in California for three years. Once he was admitted to the Bar, he started working as a trial lawyer by defending impoverished people, in particular Chinese and Mexican immigrants. This experience led to his founding the Court of Last Resort in the 1940s. The Court of Last Resort, dedicated to helping people who were imprisoned unfairly or couldn't get a fair trial, was the first of several organizations that advocate for the wrongly convicted, which among others include The Innocence Project, Center on Wrongful Convictions at Northwestern Pritzker School of Law, and Centurion.

In 1912, Gardner wed Natalie Frances Talbert. They had a daughter, Grace.  He opened his first law office in Merced in 1917, but closed it after accepting a position at a sales agency.  In 1921, he returned to law as a member of the Ventura firm Sheridan, Orr, Drapeau, and Gardner, where he remained until the publication of his first Perry Mason novel in 1933.

Gardner enjoyed litigation and the development of trial strategy but was otherwise bored by legal practice. In his spare time, he began writing for pulp magazines. His first story, The Police in the House, was published in June 1921 in Breezy magazine. He created many series characters for the pulps, including the ingenious Lester Leith, a parody of the "gentleman thief" in the tradition of A. J. Raffles; and Ken Corning, crusading lawyer, crime sleuth, and archetype for his most successful creation, Perry Mason. While the Perry Mason novels seldom delved deeply into characters' lives, the novels were rich in plot detail which was reality-based and drawn from his own experience. In his early years writing for the pulp magazine market, Gardner set himself a quota of 1,200,000 words a year. Early on, he typed stories himself, using two fingers, but later dictated them to a team of secretaries.

Under the pen name A. A. Fair, Gardner wrote a series of novels about the private detective firm Cool and Lam. In another series, district attorney Doug Selby litigated against attorney Alphonse Baker Carr in an inversion of the Perry Mason scenario.  Prosecutor Selby is portrayed as a courageous and imaginative crime solver; his antagonist Carr is a wily shyster whose clients are invariably "as guilty as hell".

Much of the first Perry Mason novel,The Case of the Velvet Claws, published in 1933, is set at the historic Pierpont Inn near Gardner's old law office in Ventura, California.  In 1937, Gardner moved to Temecula, California, where he lived for the rest of his life. With the success of the Mason series, more than 80 novels, Gardner gradually reduced his contributions to the pulp magazines until the medium died in the 1950s. Thereafter, he published a few short stories in the "glossies," such as Collier's, Sports Afield, and Look, but most of his postwar magazine contributions were nonfiction articles on travel, Western history, and forensic science. Gardner's readership was a broad and international one, including the English novelist Evelyn Waugh, who in 1949 called Gardner the best living American writer. He also created characters for various radio programs, including Christopher London (1950), starring Glenn Ford, and A Life in Your Hands (1949–1952).

Gardner's character Perry Mason was a recurring character in a series of Hollywood films in the 1930s, and then for the radio program Perry Mason, which ran from 1943 to 1955. In 1954, CBS proposed transforming Perry Mason into a TV soap opera.  When Gardner opposed the idea, CBS created The Edge of Night, featuring John Larkin—who voiced Mason on the radio show—as a thinly veiled imitation of the Mason character. Perry Mason’s character was inspired by Earl Rogers, a trial attorney who appeared in 77 murder trials but lost only three. He was recognized for the extensive use of demonstratives, e.g., visuals, charts and diagrams, during trial before it became common practice. Rogers is famous for his defense of, and attorney-client disagreement with, Clarence Darrow, a fellow attorney who was charged with attempted jury bribery in 1912.

In 1957, Perry Mason became a long-running CBS-TV courtroom drama series, starring Raymond Burr in the title role. Burr had auditioned for the role of the district attorney Hamilton Burger, but Gardner reportedly declared he was the embodiment of Perry Mason. Gardner made an uncredited appearance as a judge in "The Case of the Final Fade-Out" (1966), the last episode of the series.

He had a lifelong fascination with Baja California and wrote a series of nonfiction travel accounts describing his extensive explorations of the peninsula by boat, truck, airplane, and helicopter.

Gardner devoted thousands of hours to the Court of Last Resort, in collaboration with his many friends in the forensic, legal, and investigative communities. The project sought to review and, when appropriate, reverse miscarriages of justice against criminal defendants who had been convicted because of poor legal representation, abuse, misinterpretation of forensic evidence, or careless or malicious actions of police or prosecutors. The resulting 1952 book earned Gardner his only Edgar Award, in the Best Fact Crime category, and was later made into a TV series, The Court of Last Resort.

Personal life
In 1912, Gardner wed Natalie Frances Talbert (16 July 1885 – 26 February 1968). Their only child, Natalie Grace Gardner (January 25, 1913 — 29 February 2004), was born in Ventura, California. Gardner and his wife separated in the early 1930s, but did not divorce, and in fact their marriage lasted 56 years, until Natalie's death in 1968. After that, Gardner married his secretary, Agnes "Jean" Bethell (née Walter; 19 May 1902 – 5 December 2002), the daughter of Ida Mary Elizabeth Walter (née Itrich; 24 December 1880 – 3 March 1961).

Through his daughter, Gardner had two grandchildren: Valerie Joan Naso (née McKittrick; 19 August 1941 – 12 November 2007) and Alan G. McKittrick.

Gardner's widow died in 2002, aged 100, in San Diego. She was a member of Jehovah's Witnesses. She was survived by her brother, Norman Walter.

Death and legacy
Gardner died of cancer, diagnosed in the late 1960s, on March 11, 1970, at his ranch in Temecula. At the time of his death, he was the best-selling American writer of the 20th century. His death followed by five days that of William Hopper, who played private detective Paul Drake in the Perry Mason TV series.  Gardner was cremated and his ashes scattered over his beloved Baja California peninsula. The ranch, known as Rancho del Paisano at the time, was sold after his death, then resold in 2001 to the Pechanga Indians, renamed Great Oak Ranch, and eventually absorbed into the Pechanga reservation.

The Harry Ransom Center at the University of Texas at Austin holds Gardner's manuscripts, art collection, and personal effects. From 1972 to 2010, the Ransom Center featured a full-scale reproduction of Gardner's study that displayed original furnishings, personal memorabilia, and artifacts. The space and a companion exhibition were dismantled, but a panoramic view of the study is available online.

In 2003, a new school in the Temecula Valley Unified School District was named Erle Stanley Gardner Middle School.

In December 2016, Hard Case Crime published The Knife Slipped, a Bertha Cool–Donald Lam mystery, which had been lost for 75 years. Written in 1939 as the second entry in the Cool and Lam series, the book was rejected at the time by Gardner's publisher. Published for the first time in 2016 as a trade paperback and ebook, the work garnered respectful reviews. In 2017, Hard Case Crime followed the publication of The Knife Slipped with a reissued edition of Turn On the Heat, the book Gardner wrote to replace The Knife Slipped, and published a new edition of The Count of Nine in October 2018.

Bibliography

Cultural references
An unspecified article that Gardner wrote for True magazine is referred to by William S. Burroughs in his 1959 novel, Naked Lunch.

Gardner's name is well-known among avid crossword puzzle solvers, because his first name contains an unusual series of common letters, starting and ending with the most common letter of the English alphabet, and because few other famous people have that name.  As of January 2012, he is noted for having the highest ratio (5.31) of mentions in the New York Times crossword puzzle to mentions in the rest of the newspaper among all other people since 1993.

In 2001, Huell Howser Productions, in association with KCET, Los Angeles, featured Gardner's Temecula Rancho del Paisano in California's Gold. The 30-minute program is available as a VHS videorecording.

References

Further reading
 Fugate, Francis L. and Roberta B. (1980). Secrets of the World's Best-Selling Writer: The Story Telling Techniques of Erle Stanley Gardner. New York: William Morrow. .
 Hughes, Dorothy B. (1978). Erle Stanley Gardner: The Case of the Real Perry Mason. New York: William Morrow. .
 Johnston, Alva (1947). The Case of Erle Stanley Gardner. New York: William Morrow.
 Mundell, E. H. (1968). Erle Stanley Gardner: A Checklist. Kent, Ohio: Kent State University Press. .
 Senate, Richard L. Erle Stanley Gardner's Ventura: Birthplace of Perry Mason. Ventura, California: Citation Press. .

External links

 
 Erle Stanley Gardner Study  at the Harry Ransom Center, University of Texas at Austin
 Erle Stanley Gardner at Thrilling Detective
 Essay on Erle Stanley Gardner
 Erle Stanley Gardner pages with extensive bibliographic and other information, including pulp publications
 
 Erle Stanley Gardner searching for lost mines in Popular Science magazine
 Episodes of A Life in Your Hands, a radio program created by Gardner, in the public domain
 Episodes of Christopher London, a radio program created by Gardner, in the public domain
 I Love Lucy, "The Black Eye", Lucy's book is The D.A. Takes a Chance 
 

 
1889 births
1970 deaths
American mystery writers
20th-century American novelists
California lawyers
Writers from California
Edgar Award winners
Palo Alto High School alumni
People from Malden, Massachusetts
People from Ventura, California
People from Temecula, California
Perry Mason
Novelists from Massachusetts
American male novelists
20th-century American short story writers
American male short story writers
Western (genre) writers
20th-century American male writers